Martot is a commune in the Eure department in the Normandy region in northern France. It is situated at the confluence of the rivers Eure and Seine.

Population

See also
Communes of the Eure department

References

Communes of Eure